Det måste gå att dansa till is a studio album by Swedish dansband Larz-Kristerz, released on 26 June 2013.

Track listing
"Det måste gå att dansa till"
"Rose-Marie"
"Har du glömt"
"Lycka till"
"Midsommarnatt"
"Var är du nu, Marianne"
"Varför vänder du dig om"
"Har du kanske väntat på mig"
"Berg och dalar"
"Skyll på lantbrevbärarens moped"
"409"
"Annelie"
"Trolleri"
"Nu har det hänt igen"
"Förlåt"

Charts

Weekly charts

Year-end charts

Certifications

References

2013 albums
Larz-Kristerz albums